Jack Drinan (19 October 1923 – 28 June 2013) was an  Australian rules footballer who played with St Kilda in the Victorian Football League (VFL).	His younger brother Keith Drinan also played for and spent time as captain of St Kilda.

Notes

External links 

1923 births
2013 deaths
Australian rules footballers from Victoria (Australia)
St Kilda Football Club players